Kekeate Pass
(), also refer to it as 
Heiqiazi Pass, Heika Pass or Heiqia Daban() is a mountain pass along the China National Highway 219 with numerous hairpin turns. The mountain pass connects the Yarkand River valley to the west with the Karakash River valley to the east. Western sources often known it as
as Kirgizjangal Pass,

History

The name Kirgizjangal references the nearby historically infamous location of Kirghiz Jangal, which literally means "Kirghiz jungle" or "Kirghiz thicket." Prior to the Qing dynasty conquest of Xinjiang, the area was inhabited by Kirghiz nomads. The Kirghiz from the region were known to be bandits. They would rob caravans and sell its crew into slavery in Badakhshan. When the Qing dynasty first took control of the region in the late 1700s, they expelled the Kirghiz from the area. However, when the Qing control of region weakened during the Taiping Rebellion and Dungan Revolt in 1850s-1870s, the Kirghiz returned. This along with the economic impacts of those rebellions led to reduction in trade along the caravan route between the Indian subcontinent and Tarim Basin.

There are numerous buildings in the area built to host highway maintenance squads, many of them are now abandoned. In recent years, a few mining operations started to west of the mountain pass producing siderite iron ore and potentially copper.

See also
 Xaidulla

Notes 

  - There are numerous variations in the Chinese name, and there are numerous permutations in transcription. In Chinese, the character  is a heteronym with multiple pronunciations. The character  is a diminutive modifier in this context thus can be dropped. In addition,  meaning "mountain pass" is sometimes transcribed phonetically as "Daban". 
  - In Chinese, "黑黑子" is an archaic word for Kirghiz.

References 

Mountain passes of China
Mountain passes of Xinjiang
Kunlun Mountains